Phreatomagmatic eruptions are volcanic eruptions resulting from interaction between magma and water. They differ from exclusively magmatic eruptions and phreatic eruptions. Unlike phreatic eruptions, the products of phreatomagmatic eruptions contain juvenile (magmatic) clasts. It is common for a large explosive eruption to have magmatic and phreatomagmatic components.

Mechanisms
Several competing theories exist as to the exact mechanism of ash formation. The most common is the theory of explosive thermal contraction of particles under rapid cooling from contact with water. In many cases the water is supplied by the sea, for example with Surtsey. In other cases the water may be present in a lake or caldera-lake, for example Santorini, where the phreatomagmatic component of the Minoan eruption was a result of both a lake and later the sea. There have also been examples of interaction between magma and water in an aquifer. Many of the cinder cones on Tenerife are considered to be phreatomagmatic because of these circumstances.

The other competing theory is based on fuel-coolant reactions, which have been modeled for nuclear reactors. Under this theory, the fuel (in this case, the magma) fragments upon contact with a coolant (the sea, a lake or aquifer). The propagating stress waves and thermal contraction widen cracks and increase the interaction surface area, leading to explosively rapid cooling rates. The two mechanisms proposed are very similar and the reality is most likely a combination of both.

Deposits
Phreatomagmatic ash is formed by the same mechanisms across a wide range of compositions, basic and acidic. Blocky and equant clasts with low vesicle content are formed. The deposits of phreatomagmatic explosive eruptions are also considered to be better sorted and finer grained than the deposits of magmatic eruption. This is a result of the much higher fragmentation of phreatomagmatic eruptions.

Hyaloclastite

Hyaloclastite is glass found with pillow basalts that were produced by non-explosive quenching and fracturing of basaltic glass. These are still classed as phreatomagmatic eruptions, as they produce juvenile clasts from the interaction of water and magma. They can be formed at water depths of >500 m, where hydrostatic pressure is high enough to inhibit vesiculation in basaltic magma.

Hyalotuff
Hyalotuff is a type of rock formed by the explosive fragmentation of glass during phreatomagmatic eruptions at shallow water depths (or within aquifers). Hyalotuffs have a layered nature that is considered to be a result of dampened oscillation in discharge rate, with a period of several minutes. The deposits are much finer grained than the deposits of magmatic eruptions, due to the much higher fragmentation of the type of eruption. The deposits appear better sorted than magmatic deposits in the field because of their fine nature, but grain size analysis reveals that the deposits are much more poorly sorted than their magmatic counterparts. A clast known as an accretionary lapilli is distinctive to phreatomagmatic deposits, and is a major factor for identification in the field. Accretionary lapilli form as a result of the cohesive properties of wet ash, causing the particles to bind. They have a circular structure when specimens are viewed in hand and under the microscope.

A further control on the morphology and characteristics of a deposit is the water to magma ratio. It is considered that the products of phreatomagmatic eruptions are fine grained and poorly sorted where the magma/water ratio is high, but when there is a lower magma/water ratio the deposits may be coarser and better sorted.

Surface features

There are two types of vent landforms from the explosive interaction of magma and ground or surface water; tuff cones and tuff rings. Both of the landforms are associated with monogenetic volcanoes and polygenetic volcanoes. In the case of polygenetic volcanoes they are often interbedded with lavas, ignimbrites and ash- and lapilli-fall deposits. It is expected that tuff rings and tuff cones might be present on the surface of Mars.

Tuff rings
Tuff rings have a low profile apron of tephra surrounding a wide crater (called a maar crater) that is generally lower than the surrounding topography. The tephra is often unaltered and thinly bedded, and is generally considered to be an ignimbrite, or the product of a pyroclastic density current. They are built around a volcanic vent located in a lake, coastal zone, marsh or an area of abundant groundwater.

Tuff cones
Tuff cones are steep sloped and cone shaped. They have wide craters and are formed of highly altered, thickly bedded tephra. They are considered to be a taller variant of a tuff ring, formed by less powerful eruptions. Tuff cones are usually small in height. Koko Crater is 1,208 feet.

Examples of phreatomagmatic eruptions

Minoan eruption of Santorini
Santorini is part of the Southern Aegean volcanic arc, 140 km north of Crete. The Minoan eruption of Santorini, was the latest eruption and occurred in the first half of the 17th century BC. The eruption was of predominantly rhyodacite composition. The Minoan eruption had four phases. Phase 1 was a white to pink pumice fallout with dispersal axis trending ESE. The deposit has a maximum thickness of 6 m and ash flow layers are interbedded at the top. Phase 2 has ash and lapilli beds that are cross stratified with mega-ripples and dune-like structures. The deposit thicknesses vary from 10 cm to 12 m. Phases 3 and 4 are pyroclastic density current deposits. Phases 1 and 3 were phreatomagmatic.

1991 eruption of Mount Pinatubo

Mount Pinatubo is on the Central Luzon landmass between the South China Sea and the Philippine Sea. The 1991 eruption of Pinatubo was andesite and dacite in the pre-climactic phase but only dacite in the climactic phase. The climactic phase had a volume of 3.7–5.3 km3. The eruption consisted of sequentially increasing ash emissions, dome growth, 4 vertical eruptions with continued dome growth, 13 pyroclastic flows and a climactic vertical eruption with associated pyroclastic flows. The pre-climactic phase was phreatomagmatic.

Hatepe eruption
The Hatepe eruption in 232 ± 12 AD was the latest major eruption at Lake Taupo in New Zealand's Taupo Volcanic Zone. There was minor initial phreatomagmatic activity followed by the dry venting of 6 km3 of rhyolite forming the Hatepe Plinian Pumice. The vent was then infiltrated by large amounts of water causing the phreatomagmatic eruption that deposited the 2.5 km3 Hatepe Ash. The water eventually stopped the eruption though large amounts of water were still erupted from the vent. The eruption resumed with phreatomagmatic activity that deposited the Rotongaio Ash.

Grímsvötn eruptions 

The Grímsvötn volcano in Iceland is a sub-glacial volcano, located beneath the Vatnajökull ice cap. For a typical sub-glacial eruption, overlying glacial ice is melted by the heat of the volcano below, and the subsequent introduction of meltwater to the volcanic system results in a phreatomagmatic explosion.  Grímsvötn is host to an active geothermal system and is prone to phreatomagmatic eruptions. The melting of the overlying Vatnajökull ice cap also forms sub-glacial lakes which, when conditions are right, can burst forth as catastrophic glacial outburst floods known as jökulhlaup.

See also

References

Further reading
 Walker, G. P. L. 1971. Grain-size characteristics of pyroclastic deposits. Journal of Geology, 79, 696–714.
 Vespa, M., Keller, J. & Gertisser, R. 2006. Interplinian explosive activity of Santorini volcano (Greece) during the past 150,000 years. Journal of Volcanology and Geothermal Research, 152, 262–86.
 Riley, C. M., Rose, W. I. & Bluth, G.J.S. 2003. Quantitive shape measurements of distal volcanic ash. Journal of Geophysical Research, 108, B10, 2504.

 
Volcanology
Geological processes

Volcanic eruption types